The Zürcher Schlittschuh Club Lions (ZSC Lions) are a professional ice hockey team located in Zürich, Switzerland, playing in the National League (NL). Their home arena is the 12,000-seat Swiss Life Arena. The team was founded in 1930 and played at the Dolder-Kunsteisbahn from its establishment until 1950.

History
ZSC Lions were formed in 1997 as a result of the merger of the two local teams: the highly popular Zürcher Schlittschuh Club (German for "Zürich Skating Club"), who were struggling financially in National League A, and the ice hockey section of Grasshopper Club Zürich of the National League B, backed by entrepreneur and billionaire Walter Frey.

ZSC was the first Swiss team to play in an indoor arena (Hallenstadion). They won the Swiss championship in the years 1936, 1949 and 1961 and the prestigious Spengler Cup in 1944 and 1945. After the merger, the ZSC Lions won the Swiss Championship in 2000, 2001, 2008, 2012, 2014 and 2018, and moreover won the IIHF Continental Cup in 2001 and 2002.

Champions Hockey League and Victoria Cup

During the 2008–09 Season, the ZSC Lions participated in the first ever Champions Hockey League. For the group stage, they  were placed in group D with HC Slavia Praha and Linköpings HC. The Lions qualified for the semi-finals with a 3–1 record, first place in the group. With their defeats of the Finnish Espoo Blues, 6–3 and 4–1 respectively, they qualified for the tournament final. The first leg of the final was held on January 21, 2009 in the Magnitogorsk Arena where the Lions came back from a 0–2 deficit to Metallurg Magnitogorsk to end with a 2–2 tie. The second leg was played a week later, on January 28, 2009, in the Diners Club Arena in Rapperswil-Jona, Switzerland. ZSC Lions won the game and the Silver Stone Trophy with a 5–0 victory.

With their victory in the Champions Hockey League, the ZSC Lions qualified to play the Chicago Blackhawks of the National Hockey League for the 2009 edition of the Victoria Cup challenge. Playing at their home arena, the Lions upset the Blackhawks with a 2–1 victory, winning the trophy. It was the first time since 1991 that the Blackhawks had lost to a club in Europe.

Honors
NL Championship (9): 1936, 1949, 1961, 2000, 2001, 2008, 2012, 2014, 2018
SL Championship (4): 1973, 1981, 1983, 1989
Victoria Cup (1): 2009
Champions Hockey League/Silver Stone Trophy (1): 2009
IIHF Continental Cup (2): 2001, 2002
Swiss Cup (3): 1960, 1961, 2016
Spengler Cup (3): 1944, 1945, 1952 (disqualified for drug use)
Basler Cup (1): 1961

Players

Current roster

References

External links

ZSC Lions official website 

Ice hockey teams in Switzerland
Sport in Zürich
1930 establishments in Switzerland
Swiss Women's League teams